Rhyme Assassin (born April 3, 1981), born Tichaona Monera, is a London-based Zimbabwean hip-hop artist who rose to prominence in Zimbabwe with his song Party People in 2014.

Background
Rhyme Assassin was born in Chikomba, Chivhu and grew up in the capital city of Zimbabwe Harare's suburb Highfield and Houghton Park.

Rhyme Assassin started music in 2000 doing rap battles and performances up to 2002 when he left for the UK, he then resumed his music career in 2012 when he met a UK producer named Deep Voice who ignited his passion for music and he started writing and recording music.

The rapper rose to prominence in 2014 after the release of "Party people" a single featuring T9yce. The song was the number one on major radio stations in Zimbabwe and was on ZBC Power FM Zimbabwe charts for 12 weeks on both the daily Power FM Top 10 chart and the weekly Power FM Top 20 chart leading the track to be in top 50 of the Power FM Top 100  songs of the year 2014.

In 2014 Rhyme Assassin established Uncle Rhymes Records as his record label he now works under. In 2014, Rhyme Assassin started Mwana Anokosha concert, a charity musical event for orphans at Harare Children's Home and the event has featured several performing artist. He has also been involved with Afro Empire dance group's charity initiatives.

Discography

Albums

Singles Collections 2013
Street Anthems 2014
Kombi Edition 2014

Singles

Party People 2014
Beautiful feat. Alaina Pullen 
Tsiva 2015
Tsiva remix feat Sharky, Pmdee, Jungle Kid, Mc Potar and Ti Gonzi
Pick up my life 2018

Awards and nominations

2012 - Zimbabwe Music and Arts (ZIMA) UK - Male Artist of the Year Award
2013 - ZIMMA UK Male Artist of the Year nominee 
2013 - Zim Hip Hop Awards Best Diaspora nominee
2014 - Zim Hip Hop Awards Best Diaspora Awards winner
2015 – Zim Hip Hop Awards Best Diaspora winner

References

Zimbabwean musicians
People from Harare
1981 births
Living people